Nocardioides salsibiostraticola is a Gram-positive, aerobic, non-spore-forming and non-motile bacterium from the genus Nocardioides which has been isolated from biofilm from coastal seawater from the Norwegian Sea.

References

External links
Type strain of Nocardioides salsibiostraticola at BacDive -  the Bacterial Diversity Metadatabase

salsibiostraticola
Bacteria described in 2013